Font management software is a kind of utility software that computer users use to browse and preview fonts and typically to install and uninstall fonts. Some font management software may be able to also:

 activate and deactivate fonts (users can do this manually; sometimes programs will do this in conjunction with specific software)
 protect fonts that are required by the system by preventing them from being uninstalled
 organize fonts by groups and libraries
 find and uninstall corrupt fonts
 rename font files
 view fonts that are not currently installed
 print font samples or font books illustrating some or all of the fonts on the system
 sort fonts according to different criteria
 search for fonts meeting specific criteria

Objectives
Font management software generally possesses more font management capabilities than most operating systems.

Finding and Evaluating Fonts
Font management software allows its users to catalogue and inspect fonts on their system. Font management software allows its users to view a font in multiple ways.

Users can inspect the font in more detail, such as looking at the fonts glyphs, or comparing another font.

Font management software may also provide detail on the glyph count of a font, if the font can be embedded (such as in a PDF), or the creator of the font.

System Stability
Font management software may be able to activate or deactivate fonts depending on when they are needed. This reduces the load on the system to keep many font active at the same time.

Some font management programs can activate fonts or a specific group of fonts when a program or document launched. When the program or document is closed, the font management software can deactivate the same fonts. This method of activating fonts can activate fonts on the fly (such as during a specific project), reducing the load on the system.

Linux-based operating systems generally do not pre-load fonts on a system-wide basis. Instead, each application loads them as it needs them. Current Linux desktop environments (such as KDE and Gnome) manage fonts for applications using their internal framework library calls for font display, allowing management of fonts via the GUI.

List of font management software

Note: Information on supported fonts is not readily available from many manufacturers. However, most of the major commercial programs support OpenType and TrueType fonts.

Discontinued font management software
Note: Information on supported fonts is not readily available from many manufacturers. However, most of the major commercial programs support OpenType and TrueType fonts.

References

Further reading
 
 
 
 

Management software